{{speciesbox
|image =Microlophus thoracicus.jpg 
| status = LC
| status_system = IUCN3.1
| status_ref = 
| genus = Microlophus
| species = thoracicus
| authority = (Tschudi, 1845)
| synonyms = 
Steirolepis thoracica - Tschudi, 1845
Tropidurus thomasi - Boulenger, 1900
Tropidurus thoracicus - Henle & Ehrl 1991
}}Microlophus thoracicus'', the Tschudi's Pacific iguana, is a species of lava lizard endemic to Peru.

References

thoracicus
Lizards of South America
Endemic fauna of Peru
Reptiles of Peru
Reptiles described in 1845
Taxa named by Johann Jakob von Tschudi